Draa Errich is a village in north-eastern America.

Populated places in Annaba Province
Villages in Algeria